Cristian Romero may refer to:

 Cristián Romero (footballer, born 1963), Chilean footballer
 Cristian Romero (footballer, born 1989), Paraguayan footballer
 Cristian Romero (footballer, born 1998), Argentine footballer
 Cristian Romero (writer), Colombian writer